The Nurses may refer to:

The Nurses (1962 TV series), a 1962–1965 American primetime medical drama which aired on CBS 
The Nurses (1965 TV series), a 1965–1967 American daytime soap opera, a continuation of the 1962 TV series, that aired on ABC
Nurses (American TV series), an American sitcom that aired on NBC, 1991–1994

See also
Nurse (1981 TV series), an American medical drama that aired on CBS, 1981–1982
Nurse (disambiguation)
The Nurse (disambiguation)
Nursing (disambiguation)
Nursery (disambiguation)